Quintino Sella is a railway station in the Italian city of Bari, in the Province of Bari, Apulia. The station lies on the Bari–Barletta railway. The train services are operated by Ferrotramviaria.

The station is a one-platform station serving a single-track railway with trains going in both directions. 

The station is semi-subterranean with the platform opening directly to the street. 

The ticket vending machine is at the far end of the underground portion of the platform away from the entrance.

Train services
The station is served by the following service(s):

Bari Metropolitan services (FR1) Bitonto - Palese - Bari
Bari Metropolitan services (FR2) Barletta - Andria - Bitonto - Aeroporto - Bari
Bari Metropolitan services (FM1) Ospedale - Bari
Bari Metropolitan services (FM2) Bitonto - Aeroporto - Bari

See also
Railway stations in Italy
List of railway stations in Apulia
Rail transport in Italy
History of rail transport in Italy

External links

This article is based upon a translation of the Italian language version as at May 2014.

Railway stations in Apulia
Buildings and structures in the Province of Bari